Isaac Cowles (born April 18, 1990) is a former American soccer player who last played with the Charlotte Eagles. He is currently a graphic designer.

Career 
Cowles was a four year starter at the University of North Carolina at Charlotte. With the 49ers, he helped the program reach the final match of the 2011 NCAA Division I Men's Soccer Tournament, where he was named the tournament's defensive Most Outstanding Player. He finished his collegiate career making 79 appearances and scoring one goal.

During the collegiate offseason, Cowles played in USL League Two (then the Premier Development League) with the Real Colorado Foxes and Carolina Dynamo.

Upon graduating from Charlotte, he played one season of professional soccer with the Charlotte Eagles in the now-called USL Championship. Cowles made three appearances with the club.

References

External links 
 UNC Charlotte Profile
 

1990 births
Living people
Association football defenders
USL Championship players
USL League Two players
Charlotte 49ers men's soccer players
North Carolina Fusion U23 players
Charlotte Eagles players
Real Colorado Foxes players
American graphic designers
American soccer players
Soccer players from Colorado
NCAA Division I Men's Soccer Tournament Most Outstanding Player winners